Raidurgam is a neighbourhood in Hyderabad, Telangana, India. It is close to HITEC City and is part of the HMDA. Salarpuria Sattva Knowledge City, T-Hub and T-Works are prominent buildings in its vicinity.

Transport
It has good connectivity of buses by TSRTC. The suburb is part of the Hyderabad Metro rail line via the Raidurg metro station.

References

External links

Neighbourhoods in Hyderabad, India
Cities and towns in Hyderabad district, India